Samuel McAllister (1882 – 1957) was an English footballer who played for Grimsby Town, Motherwell, Stoke, West Ham United and Wrexham.

Career
McAllister was born in Kilmarnock and played Motherwell, West Ham United, Grimsby Town and Wrexham before joining Stoke in 1908. He played in 16 matches during the 1909–10 season scoring three goals before returning to Scottish football with Port Glasgow.

Career statistics

References

1882 births
1957 deaths
Scottish footballers
Stoke City F.C. players
Grimsby Town F.C. players
Wrexham A.F.C. players
Motherwell F.C. players
West Ham United F.C. players
Association football forwards